Javier Sánchez and Balázs Taróczy were the defending champions, but did not participate this year.

Udo Riglewski and Michael Stich won the title, defeating Petr Korda and Tomáš Šmíd 6–1, 6–4 in the final.

Seeds

  Jorge Lozano /  Todd Witsken (semifinals)
  Kevin Curren /  Laurie Warder (quarterfinals)
  Jim Courier /  Pete Sampras (first round)
  Petr Korda /  Tomáš Šmíd (final)

Draw

Draw

External links
Draw

1990 BMW Open